The New Hampshire Division of Historical Resources (DHR) is a government agency of the U.S. state of New Hampshire. Benjamin Wilson is director of DHR and the State Historic Preservation Officer, while Sarah Stewart is commissioner of DHR's parent agency, the New Hampshire Department of Natural and Cultural Resources (DNCR). The main office of DHR is located in Concord.

History
New Hampshire's Division of Historical Resources (DHR) began in 1974 as the State Historic Preservation Office (SHPO), authorized under the National Historic Preservation Act of 1966, which allowed for the creation of state historic preservation offices in each state. DHR assumed its current name in 1985. Since 2017, DHR has been part of the New Hampshire Department of Natural and Cultural Resources (DNCR).

Function

DHR has a number of historic preservation functions defined under RSA 227-C, including:
 Undertaking a statewide survey to identify and document historic properties
 Preparing the state's historic preservation plan
 Providing information on historic properties within the state
 Accepting moneys for historic preservation from public and private sources
 Cooperating with other government agencies on historic properties and preservation objectives
 Coordinating activities with other government agencies on historic preservation
 Providing technical and financial assistance to public and private entities involved in historic preservation
 Stimulating public interest in historic preservation
 Developing an ongoing program of historical, architectural and archeological research and development
 Considering proposals to erect highway historical markers
 The archaeological discovery, investigation, analysis, and disposition of human remains

DHR's mission statement reads:
The mission of the Division of Historical Resources is to preserve and celebrate New Hampshire’s irreplaceable historic resources through programs and services that provide education, stewardship, and protection.

Programs
Programs within DHR include:

 Archaeology
 Architectural History
 Certified Local Government Program (CLG)
 Enhanced Mapping & Management Information Tool (EMMIT)
 Historic Preservation Review & Compliance
 National Register of Historic Places
 New Hampshire Historical Highway Marker Program
 New Hampshire's First State House Project
 New Hampshire's Five Year Preservation Plan
 New Hampshire State Register of Historic Places
 Preservation Easements
 Project Archaeology
 State Conservation and Rescue Archaeology Program (SCRAP)
 Survey & Inventory

References

External links

Historical Resources
State history organizations of the United States
Government agencies established in 1985
1985 establishments in New Hampshire